A travel ban is one of a variety of mobility restrictions imposed by governments. Bans can be universal or selective. The restrictions can be geographic, imposed by either the originating or destination jurisdiction. They can also be based on individual status, such as health or vaccination, or as driving bans during extreme weather events. During the COVID-19 pandemic, governments banned entry by residents of some or all other countries.

For example, if New Zealand decides not to allow travel to the country, the government stops issuing travel visas. Without a valid visa, citizens of other countries cannot enter.

Pandemic 
Owing to the spread of COVID-19, many countries have restricted international and/or domestic travel.

The United States banned flights coming to the United States from India, beginning on May 4, 2021, with exceptions for U.S. citizens and those with permanent residency cards.

Weather-related bans 

A travel ban can be instituted during an extreme weather event. Local governments will ban driving in an attempt to clear major roadways, as was the case during the Late December 2022 North American winter storm. In some cases they may be enforced by military police.

Litigation 
Many controversies have sprung up about whether governments have the right to do so. In the United States, a lawsuit challenged Executive Order 13769 that banned travel from 7 Muslim majority countries.

See also
 Refusal of entry by a country to all citizens of another country
 Freedom of movement
 Persona non grata, a diplomatic measure prohibiting a person from entering or remaining in a country
 Executive Order 13769, government restriction on entry to the United States, effective January 27, 2017
 Executive Order 13780, government restriction on entry to the United States, effective March 16, 2017
 United States embargo against Cuba, travel, commercial, economic, and financial embargos imposed by the United States on Cuba.
 Countries that do not accept Israeli passports
 Travel restrictions related to the COVID-19 pandemic
 Protective sequestration, to prevent the spread of disease

References

Immigration law
International responses to the COVID-19 pandemic